Betty T. Ang is a Filipina businesswoman. She is the president of Monde Nissin, one of the largest food manufacturers in the Philippines and the country's leading producer of biscuits and noodles. Monde Nissin is owned by her husband's family, who also owns PT Khong Guan Biscuit Indonesia. In August 2017, their net worth was estimated at US$880 million.

Ang, a business graduate of Assumption College, is married to Hoediono Kweefanus, vice-chairman of Monde Nissin. They have six children.

References

Filipino people of Chinese descent
Living people
Year of birth missing (living people)
Assumption College San Lorenzo alumni